Dashtuiyeh (also Romanized as Dashtū’īyeh; also known as Dashtū) is a village in Dar Agah Rural District, in the Central District of Hajjiabad County, Hormozgan Province, Iran. At the 2006 census, its population was 86, in 26 families.

References 

Populated places in Hajjiabad County